Pernitz is a town in the district of Wiener Neustadt-Land in the Austrian state of Lower Austria.

History

The origin of the name Pernitz is the Slavic word perenica, which refers to a stream on which charcoal is used. The Slavic settlement was preceded by a Celtic settlement. The name was first mentioned in 1165 in the Falkensteiner Codex. Since the 17th century Pernitz experienced growth, interrupted by the plague in 1679, and the Second Turkish Siege in 1683.

In 1828, a road was built to the Triesting valley. It was connected by railway to Leobersdorf and Gutenstein in 1877.  Pernitz received water in 1904 and electricity in 1908. It became a market town in 1961.

Population

References

Cities and towns in Wiener Neustadt-Land District